This is a list of rural localities in the Republic of Adygea. The Republic of Adygea (Adygæ Respublik), also known as the Adyghe Republic, is a federal subject of Russia (a republic), with its territory enclaved within Krasnodar Krai. Maykop is its capital city.

Adygeysk Federal City
Rural localities in Adygeysk Federal City:

 Gatlukay
 Psekups

Giaginsky District 
Rural localities in Giaginsky District:

 Cheryomushkin
 Dneprovsky
 Dondukovskaya
 Farsovsky
 Georgiyevskoye
 Giaginskaya
 Goncharka
 Kartsev
 Kelermesskaya
 Kolkhozny
 Kozopolyansky
 Krasny Khleborob
 Krasny Pakhar
 Kursky
 Lesnoy
 Mikhelsonovsky
 Nechayevsky
 Nizhniy Ayryum
 Novy
 Obraztsovoye
 Progress
 Sadovy
 Sergiyevskoye
 Shishkinsky
 Smolchev-Malinovsky
 Tambovsky
 Vladimirovskoye
 Volno-Vesyoly
 Yekaterinovsky

Koshekhablsky District 
Rural localities in Koshekhablsky District:

 Blechepsin
 Chekhrak, Dmitriyevskoye Rural Settlement
 Chekhrak, Mayskoye Rural Settlement
 Chumakov
 Dmitriyevsky
 Druzhba
 Egerukhay
 Ignatyevsky
 Karmolino-Gidroitsky
 Kazyonno-Kuzhorsky
 Khachemzy
 Khodz
 Komsomolsky
 Koshekhabl
 Krasny Fars
 Krasny
 Maysky
 Natyrbovo
 Novoalexeyevsky
 Otradny
 Papenkov
 Plodopitomnik
 Politotdel
 Pustosyolov
 Saratovsky
 Shelkovnikov
 Volnoye

Krasnogvardeysky District 
Rural localities in Krasnogvardeysky District:

 Adamy
 Beloye
 Bogursukov
 Bolshesidorovskoye
 Bzhedugkhabl
 Doguzhiyev
 Dzhambichi
 Khatukay
 Krasnogvardeyskoye
 Mirny
 Naberezhny
 Novosevastopolskoye
 Preobrazhenskoye
 Sadovoye
 Shturbino
 Svobodny
 Ulyap
 Verkhnenazarovskoye
 Yelenovskoye

Maykop Federal City 
Rural localities in Maykop Federal City:

 Gaverdovsky
 Khanskaya
 Kosinov
 Podgorny
 Rodnikovy
 Severny
 Vesyoly
 Zapadny

Maykopsky District 
Rural localities in Maykopsky District:

 17 let Oktabrya
 Abadzekhskaya
 Bezvodnaya
 Dagestanskaya
 Dakhovskaya
 Dyakov
 Grazhdansky
 Grozny, Kirovskoye Rural Settlement
 Grozny, Pobedenskoye Rural Settlement
 Guzeripl
 Kalinin
 Kamennomostsky
 Karmir-Astkh
 Khamyshki
 Komintern
 Krasnaya Ulka
 Krasnooktyabrsky
 Krasny Most
 Kurdzhipskaya
 Kuzhorskaya
 Mafekhabl
 Makhoshepolyana
 Merkulayevka
 Michurina
 Mirny
 Novoprokhladnoe
 Novosvobodnaya
 Oktyabrsky
 Pervomaysky
 Pobeda, Kamennomostskoye
 Pobeda, Pobedenskoye
 Podgorny
 Prichtovsky
 Prirechny
 Proletarsky
 Sadovy, Krasnooktyabrskoye Rural Settlement
 Sadovy, Timiryazevskoye Rural Settlement
 Sevastopolskaya
 Severo-Vostochnyye Sady
 Shaumyan
 Shuntuk
 Sovetsky
 Sovkhozny
 Spokoyny
 Tabachny
 Timiryazeva
 Tkachyov
 Tryokhrechny
 Tsvetochny
 Tulsky
 Udobny
 Ust-Sakhray
 Vesyoly, Abadzekhskoye Rural Settlement
 Vesyoly, Kamennomostskoye Rural Settlement
 Volny

Shovgenovsky District 
Rural localities in Shovgenovsky District:

 Chernyshev
 Chikalov
 Doroshenko
 Dukmasov
 Dzherokay
 Kabekhabl
 Kasatkin
 Kelemetov
 Khakurinokhabl
 Khapachev
 Khatazhukay
 Kirov
 Leskhozny
 Leyboabazov
 Mamatsev
 Mamkheg
 Mikhaylov
 Mokronazarov
 Novorusov
 Orekhov
 Pentyukhov
 Pikalin
 Pshicho
 Pshizov
 Semyono-Makarensky
 Svobodny Trud
 Tikhonov
 Ulsky
 Vesyoly
 Zadunayevsky
 Zarevo

Takhtamukaysky District 
Rural localities in Takhtamukaysky District:

 Afipsip
 Apostolidi
 Druzhny
 Khashtuk
 Khomuty
 Kozet
 Krasnoarmeysky
 Kubanstroy
 Natukhay
 Novaya Adygea
 Novobzhegokay
 Novomogilyovsky
 Novy
 Novy Sad
 Otradny
 Panakhes
 Perekatny
 Prikubansky
 Pseytuk
 Shendzhy
 Starobzhegokay
 Staromogilyovsky
 Supovsky
 Sups
 Takhtamukay

Teuchezhsky District 
Rural localities in Teuchezhsky District:

 Assokolay
 Chabanov
 Chetuk, Russia
 Dzhidzhikhabl
 Gabukay
 Gorodskoy
 Kazazov
 Kochkin
 Kolos
 Krasnensky
 Krasnoye
 Kunchukokhabl
 Necherezy
 Neshukay
 Novovochepshy
 Pchegatlukay
 Petrov
 Ponezhukay
 Pshikuykhabl
 Shevchenko
 Shunduk
 Tauykhabl
 Tugurgoy
 Vochepshiy

See also
 
 Lists of rural localities in Russia

References

Adygea